The Neuhöfer Karpfenteiche are ponds in the west of Mecklenburg-Vorpommern, Germany. At an elevation of 34.8–35.4 m, its surface area is 3.6 km².

Ponds of Mecklenburg-Western Pomerania
Lakes of Mecklenburg-Western Pomerania